Iron Mountain Railroad could refer to:
Iron Mountain Railroad (Michigan), 1855–1859, predecessor of the Duluth, South Shore and Atlantic Railway
Iron Mountain Railway (Michigan), 1855–1857, predecessor of the above
St. Louis, Iron Mountain and Southern Railway, which was known informally as the "Iron Mountain Railway"
Iron Mountain Railway (California) Mining railroad located northwest of Redding, CA